Emily Chu (born 31 October 1960) is a Hong Kong film actress.

Partial filmography

 Jiu wan shi ba zhuan (1982)
 Duel of the Masters (1983)
 Funny Face (1985)
 Heart of Dragon (1985) - Jenny
 Millionaire's Express (1986) - Siu Bo
 Witch from Nepal (1986) - Sheila
 A Better Tomorrow (1986) - Jackie
 Scared Stiff (1987) - Alice
 Vampire's Breakfast (1987) - Angie Lin
 Flaming Brothers (1987)
 Rouge (1987) - Ah Chor
 Return of the Demon (1987) - Tayona
 A Better Tomorrow 2 (1987) - Jackie Sung
 The Big Brother (1987) - Randy
 Fortune Hunters (1987) - Yu Hau Ling
 Hai zi wang (1988)
 Devil Curse (1988) - Chan Che's wife
 Xin tiao shi ke (1989) - Wen
 Ying xiong wu dan (1989)
 Yi bu rong ci (1989)
 Qian nu yun yu qing (1989)
 Mission Recall (1990)
 Ghostly Love (1989)
 The Plot (1991)
 Bloody Hero (1991)
 Dignified Killers (1991)
 Angel or Whore (1991) - Eighteen Virgins
 The Spiritual Love (1991)
 Visa to Hell (1992)
 Magic Sword (1993) - (final film role)

External links
 
 HK cinemagic entry

Chu, Emily
Chu, Emily
Chu, Emily
Actresses from Los Angeles
Taiwanese television actresses
21st-century American women